is a 1995 fighting video game developed by Tose and published by Bandai and Infogrames for the PlayStation. Based upon Akira Toriyama's Dragon Ball franchise, its gameplay is similar to the Super Butōden sub-series, consisting of one-on-one fights with a main six-button configuration, featuring special moves, as well as five playable modes. It is referred as "Ultimate Battle 22" or "UB22" by fans due to the roster of twenty two playable characters from the series.

Announced early in 1995 as part of the Super Butōden sub-series, Ultimate Battle 22 shares the same character sprites as with another Dragon Ball Z fighting game developed by Tose for the Sega Saturn called Shin Butōden. The game garnered mixed reception from European critics but negative response from North American critics; Reviewers criticized for the slow gameplay, controls, lack of story mode and visuals but some commended its large roster of 27 playable characters. The title sold approximately between 260,942 and 320,000 copies during its lifetime in Japan.

Gameplay 

Dragon Ball Z: Ultimate Battle 22 is a fighting game similar to the Super Butōden sub-series. Players fight against other characters in one-on-one matches and the fighter who manages to deplete the health bar of the opponent wins the bout and becomes the winner of the match. The game features five modes of play, a roster of 22 playable characters and their respective transformations with five additional characters being unlockable via cheat code. The title is notable for using actual cel drawings from the animators as character sprites and cutscenes before the fights, which were a novelty at the time of its original release in Japan but theses cutscenes were removed on the European and North American releases.

Ultimate Battle 22 uses a customizable six-button control scheme. Special moves are present in conventional format, with most commands consisting of button combinations. Characters can also dash back and forth by pressing L1 and R1 respectively. Players can also charge their Ki gauge by holding the X and square buttons to unleash a special attack. Unlike previous Super Butōden entries and Buyū Retsuden, the split-screen mechanic was omitted and both fighters are now shown in a single screen.

Development and release 
Dragon Ball Z: Ultimate Battle 22 was first announced early in 1995 under the working title Dragon Ball Z: Super Butoden PlayStation Version. Ultimate Battle 22 shares the same character sprites as with another fighting game developed by Tose for the Sega Saturn called Dragon Ball Z: Shin Butōden, which is regarded to be the better between the two games but never received a western release. The title was first released by Bandai in Japan on 28 July 1995 and later in Europe in July 1996. Prior to launch, an album was published exclusively in Japan by Forte Music Entertainment on 21 July 1995, featuring arranged songs scored by composer Kenji Yamamoto as well as a vocal duet of the closing theme by Hironobu Kageyama and Kuko. The initial Japanese release included a paper for the special "Special Data Memory Card" gift campaign "Dragon Suzuki", which was distributed to 200 people via lottery. It was re-released by Bandai in Japan as a budget title on 6 December 1996. When the game was officially released in North America by Infogrames on 25 March 2003, no English dub track was produced and the pre-battle cutscenes were removed.

Reception 

Dragon Ball Z: Ultimate Battle 22 received "generally unfavorable" reviews according to Metacritic, holding a 32.03% rating on review aggregator site GameRankings. This is due to the fact that the game launched in North America in 2003, thus appearing much duller when compared to contemporary PlayStation 2 releases such as Tekken 4. The title was criticized for its slow gameplay, controls, lack of story mode and visuals but some commended its large roster of 27 playable characters. Famitsu reported that the title sold over 126,991 copies in its first week on the market. The game sold approximately between 260,942 and 320,000 copies during its lifetime in Japan.

Consoles Plus Maxime Roure and Killer praised the animated visual presentation, audio and large character roster but both reviewers stated that this aspect was not enough to be a good game based on the Dragon Ball license, criticizing the lack of innovation. Electronic Gaming Monthlys three reviewers heavily criticized the slow gameplay, poor visuals, unresponsive special moves and unbalanced fighting system, claiming that "someone deposited excrement in a jewelry box and made it look like a game." GameSpots Ryan Davis called it a "really, really terrible game." GameZones Michael Knutson stated in his review that "This game never should have come out in America." Knutson criticized the lack of a story mode, gameplay, unresponsive controls and overall audiovisual presentation.

Jeuxvideo.coms Rroyd-Y criticized the lack of story mode, presentation and slow gameplay, stating that "Ultimate Battle 22 is one of those promising apps that disappoint from the first moments of play." Joypads Grégoire Hellot praised the large character roster and pseudo-3D visual effects but felt mixed in regards to the sprite animations and criticized the slow gameplay and issues with collision detection. Next Generation reviewed the original Japanese release, criticizing the lack of innovation and sub-par graphics when compared to other fighting games, stating that "About the only thing this one has going for it is the vast selection of characters." Player Ones Christophe Delpierre commended the graphics, animations, audio and playability, stating that "Without being extraordinary, this DBZ brings together enough qualities to satisfy fans of the series. When you are told that love makes you blind..."

Notes

References

External links 

 Dragon Ball Z: Ultimate Battle 22 at GameFAQs
 Dragon Ball Z: Ultimate Battle 22 at Giant Bomb
 Dragon Ball Z: Ultimate Battle 22 at MobyGames

1995 video games
Bandai games
Ultimate Battle 22
Infogrames games
PlayStation (console) games
PlayStation (console)-only games
Video games developed in Japan
Video games scored by Kenji Yamamoto (composer, born 1958)